John Leigh (December 20, 1827 – October 5, 1893) was an American lumberman and politician.

Born in Dublin, Ireland, Leigh emigrated to the United States in 1838 and settled in Maine. In 1850, Leigh moved to Milwaukee, Wisconsin and then settled in the community of Leighton, in the town of Stiles, Oconto County, Wisconsin. He operated a saw mill and then a flour mill. In 1875, Stiles served in the Wisconsin State Assembly and was a Republican. Leigh died at his home in the town of Stiles.

Notes

1827 births
1893 deaths
Irish emigrants to the United States (before 1923)
People from Oconto County, Wisconsin
Businesspeople from Wisconsin
19th-century American politicians
19th-century American businesspeople
Republican Party members of the Wisconsin State Assembly